"Why Would I Say Goodbye" is a song written by Kix Brooks and Chris Waters, and recorded by American country music duo Brooks & Dunn.  It was released in March 1997 as the fifth and final single from their CD Borderline.  The song reached a peak of number 8 on the US Country chart, and number 9 on the Canadian RPM Country Tracks chart. This is the fifth of the six Brooks & Dunn singles in which Kix Brooks sings the lead vocals instead of Ronnie Dunn.

Chart positions
"Why Would I Say Goodbye" debuted at number 50 on the U.S. Billboard Hot Country Songs chart for the week of March 22, 1997.

Year-end charts

References

1997 singles
Brooks & Dunn songs
Songs written by Kix Brooks
Songs written by Chris Waters
Song recordings produced by Don Cook
Arista Nashville singles
1996 songs